Artūrs Timpers (4 May 1906 – 1960) was a Latvian footballer. He played in four matches for the Latvia national football team from 1925 to 1926. He was also part of Latvia's squad for the football tournament at the 1924 Summer Olympics, but he did not play in any matches.

References

External links
 

1906 births
1960 deaths
Latvian footballers
Latvia international footballers
Place of birth missing
Association football forwards